Karacasu Dam is a dam in Aydın Province, Turkey, completed in 2012. The development was backed by the Turkish State Hydraulic Works.

See also
List of dams and reservoirs in Turkey

References
DSI directory, State Hydraulic Works (Turkey), Retrieved December 16, 2009
DSI news, State Hydraulic Works (Turkey), Retrieved June 25, 2018

Dams in Aydın Province